Sins is a 2005 English-language Indian drama film directed and produced by Vinod Pande. It stars Shiney Ahuja and Seema Rahmani. The film is based on a news story that Pande read in 1988 about a Kerala priest sentenced to death on sexual harassment and murder charges. The film depicts the unconventional passionate affair of a young girl with an older priest. Deciding to keep their love story confidential, things take such a twist that their love story takes a perpetual transformation into a story marked by jealousy, hatred, and treachery.

The film has a few controversial topless scenes, as a result of which it received an A certificate from the censor board of India. The film depicting a Catholic priest romantically involved with a young woman, was protested against by those that felt it was a negative portrayal of Catholicism and indecent. Catholic Secular Forum filed a public interest litigation to stall its release but court cleared the film. Released on 25 February 2005 on 50 screens, the film was commercially unsuccessful.

The film is based on a news story that Pande read in 1988 about a priest sentenced to death on sexual harassment and murder charges.

Cast
Shiney Ahuja as Father William
Seema Rahmani as Rosemary
Nitesh Pande as Graham
Uttara Baokar as Mrs Fernandes
Shashank Shekhar Mahakul as Joe, Rosie's brother
Rishi Khurana as Joseph
Dadhi Pande as John
Vivek Mishra as Dean
Madhavi Chopra as Rajni
Mohit Nilekani as Kailash
Shanu Dev as Police Inspector
Vivek Rawat as Ismail
Gauri Shankar as Ray
Navin Kumar as Sam
Manoj Bhaskar as Bhaskar
Aditi Sengupta as Shashi
Ashutosh Pathak as Postman
Ray Mathew as Auto driver
Krishna Upadhyay as vegetable vendor
Rajat Nath as Bishop
Bikramjeet as Bishop's assistant
Kamal Adib as Judge
Sunil Kumar as William's servant
Rajesh Mishra as Julian

References

External links 
 

2005 films
English-language Indian films
Films critical of the Catholic Church
Indian erotic drama films
Films about Catholic priests
2000s erotic drama films
Films scored by Sanjoy Chowdhury
2005 drama films
Religious controversies in film